The Gymnasium Christianeum is a famous former Latin school (German: Lateinschule) in Hamburg, northern Germany. Founded in 1738 by King Christian VI of Denmark, it is now housed in a building planned by Danish designer Arne Jacobsen.

History

The first Latin school here was founded as early as 1688 (according to other sources 1683) in Altona (now a part of Hamburg). Decades later the school acquired the status of a famous Gymnasium, the most famous in the duchy of Holstein, and was re-founded by Christian VI. In 1971, the school was relocated from Hamburg-Altona to its current location in the quarter Othmarschen.The history of the Christianeum reflects also the history of Altona, Schleswig Holstein and Denmark.

In 1738, when the first eight students enlisted themselves. Two years later, the founder Christian the VI. visited the new school. In the following years, the school expanded. In 1745, it had already 45 students and four years later the first Jewish student attended the school. Between 1738 and 1800, many famous intellectuals attended the christianeum as the philosopher Salomon Maimon and the poet Johann Christoph Unzer or the famous Danish painter Jes Bundsen.

In 1816, king Frederik the VI donated the FLORA DANICA, one of the most precious treasures, even nowadays, to the library of the Christianeum, just 16 years later the distinguished historian Theodor Mommsen attended the school. He is probably one of the most famous students the school has ever had. In 1853 followed philosopher Friedrich Paulsen. 
In 1880, the Christianeum was rebuilt.
In 1885, 461 students attended the Christianeum and in the same year the first school trip was made. The 150-anniversary was celebrated in 1888.

In 1902, Theodor Mommsen received the Nobel Prize for Literature. In 1900, Hermann Weyls became a student of the school. He was going to be one of the very well established scientists of the 20th century in mathematics.

36 students of the school participate in the First World War voluntarily. In total, 133 students participate in the war. In 1917, the school had 470 students, in 1921 only 260.
In May 1925, the first school trip to Puan Klent took place.

When Hitler came into power, many teachers who did not agree with the nationalism ideology got fired. In 1934, 75% of the students were in the Hitler Youth although being part of it was not compulsory.

The school started again on 6 August 1945. 192 teachers and students became victims of the Second World War. The library got damaged which resulted from the bombings.

In the year 1946, 792 students attended the school. In mid-1947, school trips to Puan Klent started again.

In the 1950s, jazz became popular among students.

In mid-1953, the first school trip abroad was made (to Italy).
The pupil's magazine Die Lupe got a prize of the city Hamburg for being the best pupils magazine in Hamburg.

In 1960, the C-orchestra was established, which is still active nowadays.

In 1964, the advertisement for an architect for the new building was published; Danish architect Arne Jacobsen got the job.

In 1965, the first female teacher was introduced.

Start of the building of the new designed Christianeum in 1968. In the same year Russian is introduced as a subject.

Present

Nowadays, classes in Latin and English are mandatory from fifth grade. In grade nine  students can choose between either Ancient Greek or Russian. Additionally, courses in Spanish, French and Mandarin are offered. The Christianeum has a sizable music department, the school choir being the largest in Germany. Furthermore, the school actively takes part in exchange programs with schools in Chicago and St. Petersburg. On average, enrollment goes well beyond 100 students per year, exceeding most other schools in Hamburg in size.

Notable alumni
 Jacob Georg Christian Adler (1756–1834), orientalist
 Peter Behrens (1868–1940), architect and designer
 Lars Clausen (1935–2010), sociologist
 Ernst Dammann (1904–2003), Afrikanist and Nazi
 Alexander Deichsel (born 1935), sociologist
 Hans Ehrenberg (1883–1958), theologian
 Michael Franz, computer scientist
 Heinrich Wilhelm von Gerstenberg (1737–1823), poet
 Robert Koldewey (1855–1925), architect and archaeologist
 Salomon Maimon (1753–1800), philosopher
 Theodor Mommsen (1817–1903), classical scholar, Nobel laureate
 Friedrich Paulsen (1846–1908), philosopher
 Johannes Rehmke (1848–1930), philosopher
 Solomon Steinheim (1789–1866), physician, poet and philosopher
 Johannes Versmann (1820–1899), lawyer and politician
 Hermann Weyl (1885–1955), mathematician

External links

Official website 

 
Buildings and structures in Altona, Hamburg
Educational institutions established in 1738
Arne Jacobsen buildings
Modernist architecture in Germany
1738 establishments in the Holy Roman Empire